Parliamentary elections were held in Finland on 1 and 2 July 1929. The result was a victory for the Agrarian League, which won 60 of the 200 seats in Parliament. Voter turnout was 55.6%.

Background
President Relander, an Agrarian, believed that the Finnish civil servants should get a pay raise, after a long period of frozen salaries, that had caused them to lose a significant amount of purchasing power.  Most of his fellow Agrarians opposed him and the Progressive minority government of Prime Minister Mantere on this issue, arguing that the civil servants, on average, were still clearly better paid than the agricultural workers.  After the Finnish Parliament rejected the government's legislative proposal on the increase of civil servants' salaries in April 1929, President Relander dissolved Parliament and called early elections for July.  The Agrarians and Communists campaigned on the rejection of the civil servants' proposed salary increases, and both parties gained seats.  The National Coalitioners and Progressives who favoured the salary increases suffered a defeat.  President Relander was displeased by the Agrarians' victory, because he could not get along well with their leader, Mr. Kallio, but he reluctantly appointed Kallio as Prime Minister of an Agrarian minority government after the elections.

Results

References

General elections in Finland
Finland
Parliament
Finland
Election and referendum articles with incomplete results